In Greek mythology, the name Coronus (Ancient Greek: Κόρωνος means "crooked, curved") may refer to:

Coronus, king of the Lapiths, the son of Caeneus and counted among the Argonauts. In some accounts his father was Actor. His own children were Leonteus and Lysidice. He led a war against King Aegimius and was killed by Heracles.
Coronus, king of Sicyon, son of Apollo and Chrysorthe, and father of Lamedon and Corex. Coronus inherited the kingdom of Sicyon from his maternal grandfather Orthopolis. Corex succeeded to his father's power, but himself left no heirs so the kingdom was usurped by Epopeus, after whose death it went back to Lamedon.
Coronus, the Corinthian son of Thersander. He and his brother Haliartus were adopted by Athamas after the latter had lost all of his own sons. He was given land by Athamas and founded Coroneia.
Coronus, father of Anaxirhoe, herself mother of Hyrmine
Coronus, father of Asteria, herself possible mother of Idmon.

Notes

References 

 Apollodorus, The Library with an English Translation by Sir James George Frazer, F.B.A., F.R.S. in 2 Volumes, Cambridge, MA, Harvard University Press; London, William Heinemann Ltd. 1921. ISBN 0-674-99135-4. Online version at the Perseus Digital Library. Greek text available from the same website.
Diodorus Siculus, The Library of History translated by Charles Henry Oldfather. Twelve volumes. Loeb Classical Library. Cambridge, Massachusetts: Harvard University Press; London: William Heinemann, Ltd. 1989. Vol. 3. Books 4.59–8. Online version at Bill Thayer's Web Site
 Diodorus Siculus, Bibliotheca Historica. Vol 1-2. Immanel Bekker. Ludwig Dindorf. Friedrich Vogel. in aedibus B. G. Teubneri. Leipzig. 1888–1890. Greek text available at the Perseus Digital Library.
 Gaius Julius Hyginus, Fabulae from The Myths of Hyginus translated and edited by Mary Grant. University of Kansas Publications in Humanistic Studies. Online version at the Topos Text Project.
 Homer, The Iliad with an English Translation by A.T. Murray, Ph.D. in two volumes. Cambridge, MA., Harvard University Press; London, William Heinemann, Ltd. 1924. Online version at the Perseus Digital Library.
 Homer, Homeri Opera in five volumes. Oxford, Oxford University Press. 1920. Greek text available at the Perseus Digital Library.
 The Orphic Argonautica, translated by Jason Colavito.  Copyright 2011. Online version at the Topos Text Project.
Pausanias, Description of Greece with an English Translation by W.H.S. Jones, Litt.D., and H.A. Ormerod, M.A., in 4 Volumes. Cambridge, MA, Harvard University Press; London, William Heinemann Ltd. 1918. . Online version at the Perseus Digital Library
Pausanias, Graeciae Descriptio. 3 vols. Leipzig, Teubner. 1903.  Greek text available at the Perseus Digital Library.
 Stephanus of Byzantium, Stephani Byzantii Ethnicorum quae supersunt, edited by August Meineike (1790-1870), published 1849. A few entries from this important ancient handbook of place names have been translated by Brady Kiesling. Online version at the Topos Text Project.

Argonauts
Children of Apollo
Demigods in classical mythology
Mythological kings of Sicyon
Kings in Greek mythology
Characters in the Argonautica
Corinthian characters in Greek mythology
Elean characters in Greek mythology
Lapiths in Greek mythology
Sicyonian characters in Greek mythology
Boeotian mythology
Thessalian mythology